Mae Ka may refer to several places in Thailand:

Mae Ka, Chiang Mai
Mae Ka, Phayao

See also 
 Mae Kha (disambiguation)